Tejgaon Government High School (formerly Tejgaon Polytechnic High School) is a school in the Tejgaon area of Dhaka, Bangladesh. It includes both boys and girls, in separate sessions.

Tejgaon Government High School was established in 1935 and is one of the oldest schools in Dhaka. It is situated at Tejturi Bazaar (near Farmgate) which is center place of Dhaka.

23 January 2010, TPHS and TGHS celebrated 75 years of its glory. From the beginning, its providing quality education to the student.

References 

Schools in Dhaka District
1935 establishments in India
Educational institutions established in 1935
High schools in Bangladesh